Aldo Tramontano (born 7 April 1981) is an Italian rower. He competed in the men's eight event at the 2004 Summer Olympics.

References

External links
 
 

1981 births
Living people
Italian male rowers
Olympic rowers of Italy
Rowers at the 2004 Summer Olympics
Rowers from Naples